John Stark Thomson (18 February 1903 – 1976) was a British freestyle swimmer who competed in the 1924 Summer Olympics. In 1924 he was a member of the British relay team which finished fifth in the 4×200-metre freestyle relay.

References

1903 births
1976 deaths
British male swimmers
Olympic swimmers of Great Britain
Swimmers at the 1924 Summer Olympics
British male freestyle swimmers